The Ioan Slavici Classical Theatre is a theatre in the city of Arad, in the western side of Romania.

The theatre was built in 1874, and displays a neoclassical architecture style. It was designed around 1862 by the architect Anton Czigler (or possibly his son, Győző Czigler), but the construction started only in 1869, under the supervision of architect Antal Szkalnitzky.

The name was given by Ioan Slavici, a Romanian writer and native of Șiria, a commune near Arad.

External links

Historic monuments in Arad County
Theatres in Romania
Buildings and structures in Arad, Romania
Event venues established in 1874
Tourist attractions in Arad County
1874 establishments in Austria-Hungary